Satanic Rites is the third and final demo tape by Swiss extreme metal band Hellhammer. It was recorded and distributed during December 1983. Along with Hellhammer's other releases, it had a major influence on the emerging death metal and black metal genres.

Satanic Rites later appeared on the compilation album Demon Entrails along with the two other demos, Death Fiend and Triumph of Death.

Background 

Martin Eric Ain was fifteen at the time of recording Satanic Rites. The line-up of Hellhammer was constantly changing around this time.

In the book Mean Deviation: Four Decades of Progressive Heavy Metal, the demo was described as "improved but still primitive".

Three members of Norwegian black metal band Mayhem took their names from song titles from this release. Founder and guitarist, Euronymous and first two vocalists Messiah and Maniac.

Track listing 

 "Intro" – 1:00
 "Messiah" – 4:22
 "The Third of the Storms (Evoked Damnation)" – 3:04
 "Buried and Forgotten" – 6:03
 "Maniac" – 3:48
 "Eurynomos" – 3:11
 "Triumph of Death" – 7:00
 "Revelations of Doom" – 3:05
 "Reaper" – 2:30
 "Satanic Rites" – 7:19
 "Crucifixion" – 2:47
 "Outro" – 2:02

Credits 

 Tom Gabriel Fischer – vocals, guitar, bass guitar (uncredited)
 Martin Eric Ain – bass guitar, backing vocals
 Bruce Day (Jörg Neubart) – drums
 Metin Demiral – vocal introduction on "Buried and Forgotten"

References 

1983 albums
Hellhammer albums